Schema is a genus of shore flies in the family Ephydridae.

Species
Schema acrosticalis (Becker, 1903)
Schema aldabricum Mathis & Zatwarnicki, 2003
Schema durrenbergensis (Loew, 1864)
Schema fundatum (Collin, 1949)
Schema minuta Becker, 1907
Schema salina (Cresson, 1942)

References

Ephydridae
Brachycera genera
Diptera of North America
Diptera of Europe
Diptera of Africa
Diptera of Asia
Taxa named by Theodor Becker